Daytona Normal and industrial School, originally Daytona Educational and Industrial Training School for Negro Girls  was established in Daytona Beach, Florida by Mary McLeod Bethune in 1904. Bethune was active in voter registration and campaigning for women's suffrage. Her school was reportedly threatened by the Ku Klux Klan and she stood vigil to protect it.

The boarding school she established in Daytona Beach initially served five girls and Bethune's son. It became known as Daytona Educational and Industrial School for Training Negro Girls.

In 1916, White Hall, a Georgian Revival architecture brick building was constructed for the school.

In 1919 the school became known as Daytona Normal and Industrial Institute.

See also
List of industrial schools
Training school (United States)

References

schools in Florida